Anoplocnemis curvipes is a species of sap-sucking insect in the genus Anoplocnemis. They are native to sub-saharan Africa where they are considered a major pest of many types of agricultural plants such as trees and shrubs, including legumes. This has earned them the name leaf-wilter.

References

Mictini